Marian Włodzimierz Kukiel (pseudonyms: Marek Kąkol, Stach Zawierucha; 15 May 1885 in Dąbrowa Tarnowska – 15 August 1973 in London) was a Polish major general, historian, social and political activist.

One of the founders of Związek Walki Czynnej in 1908 and prominent member of Związek Strzelecki; he fought in the Polish Legions in First World War. Kukiel served from 1919 until 1920 as Deputy Head of Section III, Polish General Staff and took part in the Polish-Soviet War. Then in 1920 he became the Commanding Officer of the 20th Brigade and Head of Section III. From 1923 until 1925 he served as General Officer Commanding the 13th Infantry Division; after Piłsudski's May Coup he entered the reserves. From 1927 he was a professor of military history at Jagiellonian University. Since 1932 he became a member of PAU. From 1930 until 1939 he was director of the Czartoryski Museum in Kraków.

In 1939 he took part in the defence of Lwów. From 1939 until 1940 he was Vice-Minister of War of the Polish Government in Exile in London. From 1940 until 1942 General Officer Commanding the 1st Polish Corps based in Coatbridge Scotland, and since 1943 Minister of War of the Government in Exile. From 1945 until 1973 professor of the Polish University in Exile. From 1946 until 1973 director of the Polish History Institute in London. From 1951 to 1966 member of the Sikorski Institute in London.

He died in London in 1973 aged eighty-seven and was buried at Kensal Green Cemetery.

Works
 Dzieje wojska polskiego w dobie napoleońskiej 1795-1815 (t. 1-2 1918-20)
 Zarys historii wojskowości w Polsce (t. 1-2 1921, published in 1949)
 Wojna roku 1812 (t. 1-2 1937)
 Dzieje Polski porozbiorowej 1795-1921 (1961)

External links
Generals.dk

1885 births
1972 deaths
People from Dąbrowa Tarnowska
People from the Kingdom of Galicia and Lodomeria
Government ministers of Poland
Polish generals
20th-century Polish historians
Polish male non-fiction writers
Polish legionnaires (World War I)
Polish people of the Polish–Soviet War
People of the Polish May Coup (pro-government side)
Polish military personnel of World War II
Polish exiles
Academic staff of Jagiellonian University
Honorary Knights Commander of the Order of the Bath
Commanders of the Order of Polonia Restituta
People associated with the magazine "Kultura"